Charles Bonner Harris (April 24, 1940 in New York City – March 10, 2020 in Berkeley, California) was an American physical chemist.

Education and career
Charles B. Harris was born in New York City and spent most of his youth in Grosse Pointe. He attended the University of Michigan and received his bachelor's degree in 1963. In 1966 he received his Ph.D. in chemistry at the Massachusetts Institute of Technology under F. Albert Cotton. The following year, Harris went to the University of California, Berkeley, where he became a professor in the chemistry department. He headed this department from 2003 and was Dean of the Faculty from 2004 to 2007. In 2015 he retired. His research focus was in the field of ultrafast dynamics and electron dynamics as well as the dynamics of chemical reactions in liquids.

He educated multiple generations of scientists in chemical dynamics and ultrafast science who have since become leaders in the field including, as Ph.D. students, Paul Alivisatos, Michael D. Fayer, Roseanne Sension, Nien-hui Ge, Kelly Gaffney and as postdocs, Ahmed Zewail and Alan Campion.

Honors and awards
Harris was elected a member of the National Academy of Sciences in 2002. Besides, he is also a member the American Association for the Advancement of Science, the American Academy of Arts and Sciences, the American Physical Society, and the Optical Society of America.

References 

1940 births
2020 deaths
University of California, Berkeley faculty
Massachusetts Institute of Technology alumni
Physical chemists
Fellows of the American Association for the Advancement of Science
Fellows of the American Academy of Arts and Sciences
Fellows of the American Physical Society
Members of the United States National Academy of Sciences
American chemists
Scientists from New York City